Ashton Gate is the name of:

Ashton Gate, Bristol, a district of Bristol
Ashton Gate Stadium, a football stadium located in Ashton Gate, Bristol, home to Bristol City FC and Bristol Rugby
Ashton Gate railway station, a disused railway station located in Ashton Gate, Bristol
Ashton Gate Brewery Co, a brewery located in Ashton Gate, Bristol

See also
 Ashton (disambiguation)